Faleh Hassan Wasfi (is a coach and former international Iraqi football player, he also played for Al-Minaa.

Honors

International
Iraq
 1964 Arab Nations Cup: Champion

References

External links
  Iraqi national team players database
Al-Minaa Club: Sailors of south

Iraqi footballers
Al-Mina'a SC players
Sportspeople from Basra
Iraq international footballers
Association football midfielders
Iraqi football managers
Al-Mina'a SC managers
Year of birth missing